Kinsella v. Krueger, 351 U.S. 470 (1956), was a landmark United States Supreme Court case in which the Court ruled that the Constitution supersedes international treaties ratified by the United States Senate. According to the decision, the Court recognized the supremacy of the Constitution over a treaty, although the case itself was with regard to an executive agreement, not a "treaty" in the U.S. legal sense, and the agreement itself has never been ruled unconstitutional.

Background
Colonel Aubrey Dewitt Smith was the chief of the Logistics Section of the Plans and Operations Division at the headquarters, United States Army, Japan. A graduate of the United States Military Academy at West Point, ranked 123rd in the class of 1930, he had served with distinction with the 77th Infantry Division in the Battle of Okinawa, earning two Silver Stars, the Bronze Star Medal, the Legion of Merit and the Commendation Ribbon. He later served on the headquarters of the X Corps in the Korean War. He married Dorothy Krueger, the daughter of General Walter Krueger, who had commanded the Sixth United States Army during World War II. They had two children. 

After trying unsuccessfully to staunch the flow of blood, Colonel Smith summoned their live-in Japanese maid, Shigeko Tani, who found Dorothy Smith in her underwear and holding a knife. She took the knife from Dorothy Smith and, at Colonel Smith's request, summoned Lieutenant Colonel Joseph S. Hardin, a neighbor and fellow West Point-educated regular Army officer. Hardin found Dorothy attempting to light a pair of cigarettes. She told him: "I'm sorry I didn't get him in the heart."

Colonel Smith was taken to Tokyo Army Hospital, but died there from loss of blood at 6 am the following morning. Dorothy Smith was held in the isolation ward of the 8167th Station Hospital for observation. Major General William E. Shambora, the Surgeon General of the Far East Command, ordered a psychiatric evaluation. In December 1952, an Army Medical Board declared her fit to stand trial.

Procedural history
A military court martial was convened in Tokyo under the Uniform Code of Military Justice. A nine-member court was convened in January 1953, headed by Major General Joseph P. Sullivan. Its members, all military officers, included a Women's Army Corps lieutenant colonel. Dorothy Smith's defense lawyer, Lieutenant Colonel Howard S. Levie, initially argued that the court had no legal jurisdiction over the wife of an Army officer. When this was rejected by the court, he argued that she was not guilty due to temporary insanity. At the time of the incident, Dorothy Smith had been taking barbiturates and paraldehyde.

The court martial was told that Dorothy Smith had undergone two months' treatment for mental illness in 1951, and had attempted suicide while on the ship to Japan the year before. Her personal physician, Brigadier General Rawley E. Chambers, told the court that Dorothy Smith was subject to "neurotic explosions," that she had slashed her wrists a number of times, and that she once had assaulted another Army wife. "I believe she would be able to tell right from wrong," the general said. "But I do not believe that she had any ability to adhere to the right." By six votes to three, the court martial found Dorothy Smith guilty of first-degree murder and sentenced her "to be confined at hard labor for the rest of her natural life". A unanimous verdict of guilty would have meant a mandatory death sentence. The case was reviewed by Brigadier General Onslow S. Rolfe, the commanding officer of the Headquarters and Service Command of the Far East Command, and the Judge Advocate General. That he was junior in rank to Sullivan meant that his ability to overrule the former was constrained. Meanwhile, Dorothy Smith was flown back to the United States in a Military Air Transport Service plane, which reached Travis Air Force Base near San Francisco on 25 February 1953. She was held at the Presidio of San Francisco, and then imprisoned at the Federal Prison Camp, Alderson, in West Virginia.

Walter Krueger's lawyers filed an appeal with the United States Court of Military Appeals. Brigadier General Adam Richmond, who had been judge advocate of the Third United States Army when it had been commanded by Krueger in the early 1940s, argued that Dorothy was not sane at the time of the incident, and that the testimony that the court-martial had heard to the contrary was military rather than medical. On 30 December 1954, by a two-to-one majority, they rejected the appeal filed by Krueger's lawyers. "Since this court lacks the power to determine the weight of the evidence, even as to the issue of sanity, we are without authority to disturb the board's determination – regardless of whether we might have reached an opposite conclusion". The opinion was written by Judge Paul W. Brosman, Judge George W. Latimer concurred. Chief Judge Robert E. Quinn dissented on the grounds that the prosecution's expert witnesses testified in accordance with Army regulations rather than their knowledge and medical experience, feeling bound by the restrictive terms of the joint Air Force (AFM 160-42) and Army (TM 8–240) manual, Psychiatry in Military Law. He felt that as a consequence, "their testimony was so seriously compromised as to require, in the interests of justice a rehearing."

Krueger's attorneys filed a writ of habeas corpus with Ben Moore, Chief Judge of the U.S. District Court for the Southern District of West Virginia, in Charleston, West Virginia, on 9 December 1955, based on a decision by District Court Judge Edward A. Tamm of the United States District Court for the District of Columbia. Tamm had released Mrs. Clarice B. Covert, the wife of an Air Force Sergeant who had killed her sleeping husband with an ax in England on 9 March 1953, from Alderson on a $1,000 bond. This in turn was based on a recent ruling by the United States Supreme Court on 7 November 1955 in the case of Robert W. Toth, a former Air Force Sergeant. Toth was tried by a court martial after he had been honorably discharged from the Air Force, for a murder in Korea, committed five months before his discharge. The Supreme Court had ruled the military had no jurisdiction to try someone once they had been discharged from military service. Krueger hired Covert's lawyer, Frederick Bernays Wiener to represent Dorothy. But Moore declined to follow Tamm, and denied relief. As a result, Covert was on release while Dorothy remained incarcerated in Alderson. Krueger appealed to the Fourth Circuit Court of Appeals. The case became Kinsella v. Krueger, Nina Kinsella being the prison warden at Alderson. While the appeal was pending the Government sought certiorari from the United States Supreme Court before the 4th Circuit heard the appeal. In view of the importance of the constitutional issue presented by the case, the writ was granted without action by the Circuit Court.

Supreme Court decision 
Article One of the United States Constitution, §8, enumerates the powers of the United States Congress. These include "making rules for the government and regulation of the said land and naval forces, and directing their operations". From 1775 to 1949, the United States military exercised control over civilians under the Articles of War, under which they were subject to military courts martial. In 1916, Congress specifically extended the scope of the articles of war to cover all civilians accompanying military forces outside the United States. After World War II, the Articles of War were superseded by the Uniform Code of Military Justice (UCMJ), which came into effect on 31 May 1951. It specified that civilians were subject to the UCMJ:

These were the provisions under which Dorothy Smith was tried. The United States had struck executive agreements with Great Britain and Japan allowing American citizens to be tried under the UCMJ rather than local law. Notably, the UCMJ did not require trial by a jury, as required by Article Three of the United States Constitution, §2, and the Sixth Amendment to the United States Constitution.

The Supreme Court handed down its verdict on 11 June 1956. Writing for the majority, Justice Tom C. Clark wrote:

The Supreme Court ruled that: 

On this, the court relied for precedent on the Insular Cases. The decision was five-three, with Justices Hugo Black and William O. Douglas and Chief Justice Earl Warren dissenting. Justice Charles E. Whittaker did not participate, Justice Felix Frankfurter filed a reservation, which impelled Wiener to file a petition for a rehearing despite the fact that, as he later acknowledged, "most requests for rehearing enjoy the viability of snowballs beyond the River Styx."

Rehearing

On 8 October 1956, the first order day of its 1956 term, the Supreme Court asked J. Lee Rankin, the United States Solicitor General, for a response to Wiener's petition, which was granted on 5 November 1956. Justice John M. Harlan II had changed his mind, and Justice Sherman Minton had retired. Since he had not participated in the earlier decisions, his replacement, William J. Brennan Jr., was not involved in this decision, although he would sit on the rehearing. 

On rehearing, the Supreme Court consolidated the case with Reid v. Covert. On 10 June 1957, it reversed its previous decision. It was a stunning development; it was the first time since it had first sat in 1790 that it had reversed a decision without a major intervening change in its membership, for even without Brennan, the verdict would have been the same. Writing for the plurality, Justice Hugo Black wrote: 

Black was joined in the plurality opinion by Warren, Douglas and Brennan. Frankfurter and Harlan wrote separate concurring opinions. Only Justices Clark and Harold H. Burton dissented. The Supreme Court ruled that:

Outcome
As a result of the ruling, Dorothy Smith was released from prison and went to live with her father in San Antonio. She enrolled in secretarial course at a business college there. She still struggled with mental illness, and had a nervous breakdown in August 1958 that resulted in her being hospitalized in John Sealy Hospital in Galveston, Texas. After her release, Dorothy became a medical secretary. She died in 1996.

On 18 January 1960, the Supreme Court handed down three more verdicts to clarify and extend Kinsella v. Krueger. In Kinsella v. United States, the Court extended the ruling to dependents for non-capital offenses. Grisham v. Hagen extended it to civilian employees of the military for capital offenses, and McElroy v. United States to civilian employees for all offenses. 

The gap in the law regarding civilians employed by or accompanying the military overseas remained for many years, until the passage of the Military Extraterritorial Jurisdiction Act, which President Bill Clinton signed into law on 22 November 2000.

See also 
 Botiller v. Dominguez (1889)
 Reid v. Covert (1957)
 Wilson v. Girard (1957)
 United States ex rel. Toth v. Quarles (1955)

Notes

References

External links 
 
 
1957 in United States case law
United States Supreme Court cases
United States Supreme Court cases of the Warren Court
United States foreign relations case law
United States military law
Court-martial cases